Shiv Shankar Singh (born 6 March 1962) is an Indian politician from Bihar and the state General Secretary of the Lok Jan Shakti Party (LJP).

Career
He contested the election from the assembly constituency of Kargahar in the Bihar Legislative Assembly elections in 2010.

Background
Singh was born into a farmer family in Jagdishpur, Bihar to Late Hemraj Singh.

References

Lok Janshakti Party politicians
Living people
1962 births
People from Rohtas District
Bihar MLAs 2010–2015